Nalband in Iran may refer to:
 Nalband, Gilan
 Nalband, Kermanshah
 Nalband, West Azerbaijan